Bashy Quraishy is a Danish-Pakistani author and consultant regarding minority rights.

Life
Quraishy was born in India, but grew up in Pakistan. Quraishy has studied Engineering in Germany and United States, and later studied International Marketing in London. Quraishy is a member of a number of Commissions, Committees and Boards involved with Human Rights, Ethnic/Religious Equality Issues, anti-racism, anti-discrimination, Islamophobia and anti-Semitism, both in Denmark and internationally.

Quraishy is the Chief Editor of MediaWatch, a quarterly magazine on media and minorities; Chair of media monitoring organisation Fair Play; and member of the Advisory Council of Danish Institute for Human Rights.

In 2001–2007 Quraishy was President of ENAR, the largest EU network against racism with over 700 member organisations. Since November 2007, Quraishy is Chairman of ENAR’s Advisory Council, Chair of the European Platform for Jewish Muslim Co-operation, member of the "Board of Trustees" of the Dutch Foundation "More colour in the media", General Secretary of the network EMISCO (European Muslim Initiative for Social Cohesion), and Member of the Advisory Board for the Migration Research Centre at Hacettepe University. Quraishy is also senior adviser to COJEP International, a France-based inter-cultural youth organisation, and from 2005–2007 sat on EU Commission’s High Level Committee on the Social and Labour Market integration of disadvantaged ethnic minorities in EU.

Quraishy contributes regularly to the Danish and European press with essays, chronicles and TV debates as well as lectures on various issues concerning Ethnic Minorities in EU, Islam in  western media, benefits of interculturalism, globalization, anti-Semitism and Islamophobia, racism’s consequences, and integration’s dilemma in Europe. Since January 2010, he hosts a TV programme, "Bashy’s Corner", on Kanal Hovedstaden.

Publications
Books published:
 Fort Europa –1994
 EU – the lost paradise - 1995
 European Union or Fortress Europe – 1996
 I am not a racist but --. – 1996
 My Europe – 1997
 Searching for a humane Europe – 1998
 From Punjab to Copenhagen – 1999
 Danish identity – seen through brown eyes - 2003

Articles:
 A Minority Perspective on the EU’s Commitment to Promoting Anti-Discrimination Policies, in: Robertson-von Trotha, Caroline Y. (ed.): Europe: Insights from the Outside (= Kulturwissenschaft interdisziplinär/Interdisciplinary Studies on Culture and Society, Vol. 5), Baden-Baden - 2011

Awards
2007—Award for action against racism and discrimination, given by COJEP international-France
2007—Ambassador for Peace by Universal Peace Foundation. South Korea
2008—Medal for outstanding services for inter-faith work. Mardin, Turkey
2008—Certificate of appreciation-International Conference of Islamic Scholars
2008—Hero Award for services rendered to Pakistani and ethnic minority communities in Denmark by Pakistan Society
2010—Shield of Honors for contribution to New Europe Initiative by COJEP International Strasbourg
2012—Award for contribution at International conference held by Commerce University and EMISCO on Islamophobia
2012—Shield of Honors for contribution at Turks in Europe Conference by Gaziantep University
2012—Shield of honors for inter-cultural communication by Fatima Jinnah Women University
2013—Award by Hacettepe University for contribution at the international conference on Migration, Islam and multiculturalism in Europe

References

Sources

External links
Is There Nothing Sacred? by Bashy Quraishy
His website 
Television programme

Muslim writers
Muhajir people
Pakistani emigrants to Denmark
Year of birth missing (living people)
Living people